The following is a list of awards and nominations received by Australian rapper and singer the Kid Laroi. These include an APRA Award, two ARIA Awards and a National Indigenous Music Award. In 2021, his collaborations with Justin Bieber on the single "Stay" and Bieber's album Justice garnered him nominations for the Grammy Awards for Best New Artist and Album of the Year, respectively.

Awards and nominations

American Music Awards
The American Music Awards (AMAs) is an annual American music awards show, generally held in the fall, created by Dick Clark in 1973 for ABC when the network's contract to air the Grammy Awards expired.

! 
|-
! scope="row" rowspan="2"| 2021
| Himself
| New Artist of the Year
| 
| rowspan="2"|
|-
| F*ck Love
| Favorite Album - Pop
| 
|}

APRA Awards
The APRA Awards are several award ceremonies run in Australia by the Australasian Performing Right Association (APRA) to recognise composing and song writing skills, sales and airplay performance by its members annually. 

! 
|-
| 2021
| Charlton Howard  The Kid Laroi
| Breakthrough Songwriter of the Year
| 
| 
|-
| rowspan="5"| 2022
| Himself
| Songwriter of the Year
| 
| rowspan="5"| 
|-
| "Stay" (with Justin Bieber)
| Song of the Year
| 
|-
| rowspan="2"| "Without You"
| Most Performed Australian Work
| 
|-
| rowspan="2"| Most Performed Hip Hop/Rap Work
| 
|-
| "My City" (with OneFour)
| 
|-
| 2023
| "Thousand Miles"
| Song of the Year 
|  
| 
|-
|}

ARIA Music Awards
The ARIA Music Awards is an annual ceremony presented by Australian Recording Industry Association (ARIA), which recognise excellence, innovation, and achievement across all genres of the music of Australia. They commenced in 1987.

! 
|-
! scope="row" rowspan="3"| 2020
| rowspan="3"| F*ck Love
| Best Male Artist
| 
| rowspan="3"| 
|-
| Breakthrough Artist
| 
|-
| Best Hip Hop Release
| 
|-
! scope="row" rowspan="4"| 2021
| rowspan="2"| "Stay" 
| Best Artist
| 
| rowspan="4"| 
|-
| Best Pop Release
| 
|-
| rowspan="2"| "Without You" 
| Single of the Year
| 
|-
| Best Hip Hop Release
| 
|-
! scope="row" rowspan="5"|  2022
| rowspan="3"| "Thousand Miles"
| Best Solo Artist
| 
| rowspan="5"| 
|-
| Best Pop Release
| 
|-
| Song of the Year
| 
|-
| "Tokyo to Paris" (with Fivio Foreign)
| Best Hip Hop / Rap Release 
| 
|-
| End of the World Tour
| ARIA Award for Best Australian Live Act
| 
|-
|}

Billboard Music Awards

! 
|-
! scope="row" rowspan="8"| 2022
| Himself
| Top New Artist
| 
| rowspan="8"| 
|-
| F*ck Love
| Top Rap Album
| 
|-
| rowspan="6"| "Stay" 
| Top Hot 100 Song
| 
|-
| Top Streaming Song
| 
|-
| Top Radio Song
| 
|-
| Top Collaboration
| 
|-
| Top Billboard Global 200 Song
| 
|-
| Top Billboard Global (Excl. U.S.) Song
| 
|}

Gaygalan Awards
The Gaygalan Awards are an annual event created to hand out prizes for LGBT achievements, established by Swedish magazine QX. They were first awarded in 1999.

! 
|-
! scope="row"| 2022
| "Stay"(with Justin Bieber)
| International Song of the Year
| 
|
|}

Grammy Awards

! 
|-
! scope="row" rowspan="2"| 2021
| Himself
| Best New Artist
| 
| rowspan="2"|
|-
| Justice (as a featured artist)
| Album of the Year
| 
|}

iHeartRadio Music Awards
The iHeartRadio Music Awards is an international music awards show founded by iHeartRadio in 2014.

! 
|-
! scope="row" rowspan="5"| 2022
| Himself
| Best New Pop Artist
| 
|rowspan="5"|
|-
|rowspan="4"|"Stay" (with Justin Bieber)
| Song of the Year
| 
|-
| Best Collaboration
| 
|-
| Best Music Video
| 
|-
| TikTok Bop of the Year
| 
|}

iHeartRadio Titanium Awards 
iHeartRadio Titanium Awards are awarded to an artist when their song reaches 1 Billion Spins across iHeartRadio Stations.

J Awards
The J Awards are an annual series of Australian music awards that were established by the Australian Broadcasting Corporation's youth-focused radio station Triple J. They started in 2005.

! 
|-
! scope="row"| 2020
| F*ck Love
| Australian Album of the Year
| 
| 
|}

LOS40 Music Awards
The LOS40 Music Awards (formerly Premios Principales del Año / Premios 40 Principales) are awards presented since 2006 by Spanish radio station Los 40 (formerly known as Los 40 Principales).

! 
|-
! scope="row" rowspan=3| 2021
| Himself
| Best International New Act
| 
| rowspan=3|
|-
| "Without You"
| Best International Song
| 
|-
| F*ck Love 3+: Over You
| Best International Album
| 
|}

MTV Europe Music Awards
The MTV Europe Music Awards is an award presented by Viacom International Media Networks to honour artists and music in pop culture.

! 
|-
! scope="row"| 2020
| Himself
| Best Australian Act
| 
| 
|-
! scope="row" rowspan="5"| 2021
| rowspan="3"| Himself
| Best New Act
| 
| rowspan="5"|
|-
| Best Push Act
| 
|-
| Best Australian Act
| 
|-
| rowspan="2"| "Stay" 
| Best Song
| 
|-
| Best Collaboration
| 
|}

MTV Video Music Awards
The MTV Video Music Awards, commonly abbreviated as VMA, were established in 1984 by MTV to celebrate the top music videos of the year.

! 
|-
! scope="row" rowspan="3"| 2021
| Himself
| Best New Artist
| 
| rowspan="2"| 
|-
| "Without You"
| Push Performance of the Year
| 
|-
| rowspan="3"|"Stay" 
| Song of Summer
| 
| 
|-
! scope="row" rowspan="2"|2022
| Best Collaboration
| 
| rowspan="2"|
|-
| Best Visual Effects
| 
|}

National Indigenous Music Awards
The National Indigenous Music Awards recognise excellence, innovation and leadership among Aboriginal and Torres Strait Islander musicians from throughout Australia. They commenced in 2004.

! 
|-
! scope="row" rowspan="3"| 2021
| Himself
| Artist of the Year
| 
| rowspan="3"| 
|-
| "Without You"
| Song of the Year
| 
|-
| F*ck Love
| Album of the Year
| 
|-
! scope="row" rowspan="1"| 2022
| Himself
| Artist of the Year
| 
| 
|-
|}

People's Choice Awards
The People's Choice Awards recognizing people in entertainment, voted online by the general public and fans.

! 
|-
! scope="row" rowspan="4"| 2021
| Himself
| New Artist of the Year
| 
|rowspan="4"|
|-
|rowspan="3"|"Stay" (with Justin Bieber)
| Song of the Year
| 
|-
| Music Video of the Year
|
|-
|Collaboration of the Year
|
|}

Rolling Stone Australia Awards
The Rolling Stone Australia Awards are awarded annually in January or February by the Australian edition of Rolling Stone magazine for outstanding contributions to popular culture in the previous year.

! 
|-
|rowspan="2"| 2021
| F*ck Love
| Best Record
| 
|rowspan="2"|
|-
| The Kid Laroi
| Rolling Stone Global Award
| 
|-
|rowspan="2"| 2022
| "Stay"
| Best Single
| 
|rowspan="2"|
|-
| The Kid Laroi
| Rolling Stone Global Award
| 
|-
| 2023
| "Thousand Miles"
| Best Single
| 
| 
|-
|}

Top 40 Awards

The Top 40 Awards is an annual awards show presented by Qmusic, a dutch radio station in Netherlands which honors Dutch artists and foreign musicians. The awards held annually since 2018.

! 
|-
! scope="row" rowspan="3"|2022
| rowspan="2"|Himself
| Best International Newcomer
| 
| rowspan="3"|
|-
| Best International Artist
| 
|-
| "Stay" 
| Biggest International Hits
|

Notes

References

Awards
Kid Laroi, The